Caribou Island Lighthouse sits on the uninhabited Caribou Island in the eastern end of Lake Superior,  south of Michipicoten Island. It lies entirely within the territorial waters of Canada although only about three miles from the international border between Canada and the United States.

History
It is a hexagonal concrete tower with six flying buttresses. The structure is painted white, while the lantern, gallery and watch room are red. It is only accessible by boat or floatplane via a shallow, rocky harbour on the east side, or by helicopter via a landing area on the north side.

Keepers
R. May 1886 – 1887 
Charles James Pim 1887–1898 
Wilbrod O. Demers 1899–1906 
Antoine Boucher 1907–1912 
George W. Johnston 1912–1921 
J. George Penfold 1921–1922 
John W. Kennedy 1922–1928 
Charles N. McDonald 1928–1935 
Arthur W. Hurley 1935–1962 
Alfred Thibeault 1962–1964 
George Rutherford 1964–? 
Reg Dawson (at least 1968) 
Bert Hopkins

See also
 List of lighthouses in Ontario
List of lighthouses in Canada
Henri de Miffonis

References

External links
 Aids to Navigation Canadian Coast Guard

Lighthouses completed in 1912
Lighthouses in Ontario
1912 establishments in Ontario